A number of ships have been used for Danish marine research and Danish-led expeditions. Some were dedicated research ships and functional in many years, other were bought or chartered for a limited time for one or more dedicated expeditions. These expeditions are typically named after the ship.

Most information has been compiled from Sandbeck (2007), Wolff (1967) and Christiansen (2010). Additional references are listed in the table.

The table does not include research ships that are or were operated independently by Greenland and the Faroe Islands (such as R/V Sanna, M/V Tarajoq and R/V Jákup Sverri), which are self-governing parts of the Kingdom of Denmark. 

Overview of ships which serve or has served as Danish research ships. Also indicated are ships purchased specifically for major Danish funded expeditions.

Notes
History before 1913 unknown
Fate after 1935 unknown

References 

Research vessels of Denmark
Research
Research ships
Research ships